The following is the 1995–96 network television schedule for the six major English language commercial broadcast networks in the United States. The schedule covers primetime hours from September 1995 through August 1996. The schedule is followed by a list per network of returning series, new series, and series cancelled after the 1994–95 season. All times are Eastern and Pacific, with certain exceptions, such as Monday Night Football.

New series highlighted in bold.

Each of the 30 highest-rated shows is listed with its rank and rating as determined by Nielsen Media Research.

 Yellow indicates the programs in the top 10 for the season.
 Cyan indicates the programs in the top 20 for the season.
 Magenta indicates the programs in the top 30 for the season.
Other Legend
 Light blue indicates local programming.
 Gray indicates encore programming.
 Blue-gray indicates news programming.
 Light green indicates sporting events.
 Light Purple indicates movies. 
 Red indicates series being burned off and other regularly scheduled programs, including specials.

Note: This is the first fall season for The WB and UPN. The schedules of either network would not be constant until fall 1999, when the WB decided to air shows from Sunday through Friday and UPN would air Monday through Friday. This is also the first television season to officially end in the month of May. From July 19 to August 4, 1996, all of NBC's primetime programming was preempted in favor of coverage of the 1996 Summer Olympics in Atlanta.

PBS is not included; member stations have local flexibility over most of their schedules and broadcast times for network shows may vary.

Sunday

Monday

Tuesday

Wednesday

Thursday

Friday

Saturday 

Note: JAG was on Saturdays until February 3, 1996; then, on March 13, 1996, NBC moved the show to Wednesdays.

By network

ABC 

Returning series
20/20
The ABC Sunday Night Movie
America's Funniest Home Videos
Boy Meets World
Coach
The Commish
Ellen
Family Matters
Grace Under Fire
Hangin' with Mr. Cooper
Home Improvement
Lois & Clark: The New Adventures of Superman
The Marshal
Monday Night Football
NYPD Blue
Primetime Live
Roseanne
Step by Step
Turning Point

New series
Aliens in the Family *
Before They Were Stars *
Buddies *
Champs *
Charlie Grace
The Dana Carvey Show *
The Drew Carey Show
The Faculty *
High Incident *
Hudson Street
The Jeff Foxworthy Show
Maybe This Time
The Monroes
Muppets Tonight *
Murder One
The Naked Truth
Second Noah *
World's Funniest Videos *

Not returning from 1994–95:
All-American Girl
Baseball Night in America
Blue Skies
Bringing up Jack
Day One
Extreme
Full House
Matlock
McKenna
Me and the Boys
My So-Called Life
On Our Own
Sister, Sister (moved to The WB)
Thunder Alley
A Whole New Ballgame

CBS

Returning series
48 Hours
60 Minutes
CBS Sunday Movie
Chicago Hope
Cybill
Dave's World
Diagnosis: Murder
Dr. Quinn, Medicine Woman
Due South
Murder, She Wrote
Murphy Brown
The Nanny
Picket Fences
Rescue 911
Touched by an Angel
Walker, Texas Ranger

New series
Almost Perfect
American Gothic
Bless This House
The Bonnie Hunt Show
Can't Hurry Love
Central Park West
The Client
Courthouse
Dweebs
Good Company *
High Society *
The Louie Show *
Matt Waters *
My Guys *
Nash Bridges
New York News

Not returning from 1994–95:
The Boys Are Back
Burke's Law
Christy
Daddy's Girls
Double Rush
Eye to Eye with Connie Chung
The 5 Mrs. Buchanans
The George Wendt Show
Hearts Afire
Love & War
Muddling Through
Northern Exposure
The Office
Under One Roof
Under Suspicion
Women of the House
The Wright Verdicts

Fox

Returning series
America's Most Wanted
Beverly Hills, 90210
COPS
Encounters: The Hidden Truth
FOX Night at the Movies
Living Single
Married... with Children
Martin
Melrose Place
New York Undercover
Party of Five
The Simpsons
Sliders
The X-Files

New series
The Crew
Kindred: The Embraced *
L.A. Firefighters *
The Last Frontier *
Local Heroes *
Misery Loves Company
MADtv
Ned and Stacey
Partners
The Preston Episodes
Profit *
The Show *
Saturday Night Special
Space: Above and Beyond
Strange Luck
Too Something
What's So Funny? *

Not returning from 1994–95:
The Critic
Dream On
Fortune Hunter
Get Smart
The George Carlin Show
The Great Defender
Hardball
House of Buggin'
M.A.N.T.I.S.
Medicine Ball
Models Inc.
My Wildest Dreams
VR.5
Wild Oats

NBC

Returning series
Dateline NBC
ER
Frasier
The Fresh Prince of Bel-Air
Friends
Homicide: Life on the Street
Hope and Gloria
In the House
The John Larroquette Show
Law & Order
Mad About You
NBC Sunday Night Movie
The NBC Monday Movie
NewsRadio
seaQuest 2032 (formerly known as seaQuest DSV)
Seinfeld
Sisters
Unsolved Mysteries
Wings

New series
3rd Rock from the Sun *
Boston Common *
Brotherly Love
Caroline in the City
The Home Court
JAG
Malibu Shores *
Minor Adjustments (moved to UPN)
The Pursuit of Happiness
The Single Guy *

Not returning from 1994–95:
Amazing Grace
Blossom
The Cosby Mysteries
Earth 2
Empty Nest
High Sierra Search and Rescue
Madman of the People
The Martin Short Show
The Mommies
Pride & Joy
Something Wilder
Sweet Justice
Time Life's Lost Civilizations

UPN

Returning series
Star Trek: Voyager

New series
Deadly Games
Live Shot
Minor Adjustments (moved from NBC)
Moesha *
Nowhere Man
The Paranormal Borderline *
The Sentinel *
Swift Justice *

Not returning from 1994–95:
Legend
Marker
Pig Sty
Platypus Man
The Watcher

The WB

The Parent 'Hood
Sister, Sister (moved from ABC)
Unhappily Ever After
The Wayans Bros.

New series
Cleghorne!
First Time Out
Kirk
Pinky and the Brain
Savannah *
Simon

Not returning from 1994–95:
Muscle

Note: The * indicates that the program was introduced in midseason.

References

United States primetime network television schedules
United States Network Television Schedule, 1995-96
United States Network Television Schedule, 1995-96